Hakea gilbertii is a shrub in the family Proteacea and is endemic  to an area in the Wheatbelt region of Western Australia. It is an upright, prickly shrub with  greyish needle-shaped leaves and clusters of fragrant flowers from late winter to spring.

Description
It blooms from August to September and produces sweetly scented white-cream or red-pink flowers in large clusters in upper leaf axils. The small fruit are smooth in between warty protuberances ending with a small backward pointed beak.

Taxonomy and naming
Hakea gilbertii was first formally described in 1855 by English botanist Richard Kippist and the description was published in Hooker's Journal of Botany and Kew Garden Miscellany This species was named after John Gilbert the English naturalist and explorer.

Distribution and habitat
This species grows from Eneabba through the central wheatbelt region of Western Australia south to Dumbleyung on sand, loam, clay and lateritic gravel in heath and scrubland. This species grows best in full sun where drainage is good.  It is frost tolerant and moderately drought resistant. A good bird habitat due to its dense and prickly growth.

Conservation status
Hakea gilbertii is classified as "not threatened" by the Western Australian Government.

References

gilbertii
Eudicots of Western Australia
Plants described in 1855
Taxa named by Carl Meissner